Qinshui County is a county in the southeast of Shanxi province, China. It is under the administration of Jincheng City, and is both its northernmost and westernmost county-level division.

Climate

Transportation
 Houma–Yueshan Railway

References

www.xzqh.org 

County-level divisions of Shanxi